The Alma-Ata Regional Committee of the Communist Party of Kazakhstan was the position of highest authority in the city of Alma Ata in the Kazakh SSR in the USSR. The position was created on March 10, 1932, and abolished on September 7, 1991. The First Secretary was a de facto appointed position usually by the Politburo or the General Secretary himself.

List of First Secretaries of the Regional Committee

See also 
 Communist Party of the Soviet Union
 Communist Party of Kazakhstan
 Almaty

References 

Kazakh Soviet Socialist Republic
Almaty Region
Communist parties in Kazakhstan
Regional Committees of the Communist Party of the Soviet Union
1932 establishments in the Soviet Union
1991 disestablishments in the Soviet Union